{{DISPLAYTITLE:Iodine (125I) human albumin}}

Iodine (125I) human albumin (trade name Jeanatope) is human serum albumin iodinated with iodine-125, typically injected to aid in the determination of total blood and plasma volume.

Iodine-131 iodinated albumin (trade name Volumex) is used for the same purposes.

Medical uses
Iodine (125I) human albumin is used to determine a person's blood volume. For this purpose, a defined amount of radioactivity in form of this drug is injected into a vein, and blood samples are drawn from a different body location after five and fifteen minutes. From the radioactivity of these samples, the original radioactivity per blood volume can be calculated; and knowing the total amount of radioactivity injected, one can calculate the total blood volume.

It can also be used to calculate the blood plasma volume using a similar method. The main difference is that the drawn blood sample has to be centrifuged to separate the plasma from the blood cells.

Contraindications
The US Food and Drug Administration lists no contraindications for this drug.

Adverse effects
There is a theoretical possibility of allergic reactions after repeated use of this medication.

Pharmacokinetics
Iodine-125 is a radioactive isotope of iodine that decays by electron capture with a physical half-life of 60.14 days. The biological half-life in normal individuals for iodine (125I) human albumin has been reported to be approximately 14 days. Its radioactivity is excreted almost exclusively via the kidneys.

References

Radiopharmaceuticals
Iodine